Magnificent Obsession is a 1954 American romantic drama film directed by Douglas Sirk starring Jane Wyman and Rock Hudson. The screenplay was written by Robert Blees and Wells Root, after the 1929 book Magnificent Obsession by Lloyd C. Douglas. The film was produced by Ross Hunter. Sirk sometimes claimed that the story was based distantly on the Greek legend of Alcestis.

This is a remake of the 1935 film with the same name.

In 1935, Universal Pictures had introduced Magnificent Obsession, starring Irene Dunne and Robert Taylor, based on Lloyd C. Douglas' book.

Plot
Spoiled playboy Bob Merrick's reckless behaviour causes him to lose control of his speedboat. Rescuers send for the nearest resuscitator, located in Dr. Phillips's house across the lake. While the resuscitator is being used to save Merrick, Dr. Phillips suffers a heart attack and dies. Merrick ends up a patient at Dr. Phillips's clinic, where most of the doctors and nurses resent the fact that Merrick inadvertently caused Dr. Phillips's death.

Helen Phillips, Dr. Phillips's widow, receives a flood of calls, letters, and visitors all offering to pay back loans that Dr. Phillips refused to accept repayment of during his life. Many claimed he refused by saying "it was already used up." Edward Randolph, a famous artist and Dr. Phillips's close friend, explains to Helen what that phrase means. This helps her to understand why her husband left little money, even though he had a very successful practice.

Merrick, who had once been a medical student but who abandoned his studies,  discovers why everyone dislikes him. He runs from the clinic but collapses in front of Helen's car and ends up back at the hospital, where she learns his true identity. After his discharge, Merrick leaves a party, drunk. Merrick runs off the road and ends up at the home of Edward Randolph, who recognizes him. Randolph explains the secret belief that powered his own art and Dr. Phillips's success.  Merrick decides to try out this new philosophy. His first attempt causes Helen to step into the path of a car while trying to run away from Merrick's advances. She is left blind as a result of this accident.

Merrick soberly commits to becoming a doctor, trying to fulfill Dr. Phillips's legacy. He also has fallen in love with Helen and secretly helps her adjust to her blindness under the guise of being simply a poor medical student, Robby.

Merrick secretly arranges for Helen to travel to Europe and consult the best eye surgeons in the world. After extensive tests, these surgeons tell Helen there is no hope for recovery. Right after this, Robby shows up at her hotel to provide emotional support but eventually discovers that Helen has already guessed his real identity. Merrick asks Helen to marry him. Later that night, Helen realizes she will be a burden to him, and so runs away and disappears.

Many years pass and Merrick is now a dedicated and successful brain surgeon who secretly continues his philanthropic acts, and searches for Helen. One evening, Randolph arrives with news that Helen is very sick, possibly dying, in a small Southwest hospital. They leave immediately for the hospital. Merrick arrives to find that Helen needs complex brain surgery to save her life. As the only capable surgeon at the hospital, Merrick performs this operation. After a long night waiting for the results, Helen awakens and discovers she can now see.

Cast
 Jane Wyman as Helen Phillips 
 Rock Hudson as Bob Merrick
 Barbara Rush as Joyce Phillips 
 Agnes Moorehead as Nancy Ashford 
 Otto Kruger as Randolph
 Gregg Palmer as Tom Masterson
 Paul Cavanagh as Dr. Giraud
 Sara Shane as Valerie 
 Richard H. Cutting as Dr. Dodge
 Judy Nugent as Judy
 Helen Kleeb as Mrs. Eden
 Rudolph Anders as Dr. Fuss
 Fred Nurney as Dr. Laradetti
 John Mylong as Dr. Hofer
 Jack Kelly as First Mechanic (uncredited)
 Alexander Campbell as Dr. Allan
 Mae Clarke as Mrs. Miller
 Harvey Grant as Chris
 Joseph Mell as Dan

Production
Magnificent Obsession was previously filmed in 1935, also by Universal, as Magnificent Obsession with Irene Dunne and Robert Taylor.  Sirk began production on Magnificent Obsession, his previous production, Taza, Son of Cochise having wrapped up the month before.

Taza, a 3-D western, also starred Rock Hudson, and it was the second time the two had worked together (the first time being 1952's Has Anybody Seen My Gal?).  Hudson had just begun to start his career at that point, previously playing leading parts in Universal B-movies, usually directed by Joseph Pevney or Frederick De Cordova.

Pre-production scouting for locations began on August 26, 1953 by director Douglas Sirk, Director of Photography Russell Metty, and Unit Manager Edward K. Dodds. Rehearsals began on September 8. Second-unit footage of locations at Lake Tahoe began filming on September 14. An Unlimited Hydroplane  speedboat, "Hurricane IV", was secured for the second unit footage of Hudson's boat. It was shot on Lake Arrowhead and was piloted by racer Bill Cantrell.

Charles Bickford was originally cast in the role of Randolph, but was withdrawn from the cast on September 15. Sirk and Wyman were ill, and Rock Hudson injured, so filming of Magnificent Obsession was delayed longer than Bickford had anticipated. Although the studio and Bickford had come to an oral agreement and trade announcements mentioned Bickford in the role, Bickford had at the same time made an agreement with Warner Bros. for another picture and  walked out on the Magnificent Obsession when shooting began on the 1954 version of A Star is Born, in which he played studio head, Oliver Niles. Bickford was replaced by free-lance character actor Otto Kruger.

While second-unit footage wrapped at Lake Tahoe, screen tests of Barbara Rush, Rock Hudson, Agnes Moorehead, Jane Wyman, Gigi Perreau, Donna Corcoran, and Sheila James took place on Stage 8 in Universal City on September 16 and 17. Director Sirk was ill, and utility director Joseph Pevney filled in. The next day, Corcoran, Hudson and Judy Nugent were tested by Pevney. Test shots were taken in Lake Arrowhead with the new Cinemascope anamorphic lens process, an early consideration. The production started in a flat widescreen process at an aspect ratio of 2:1, at that time Universal's standard ratio.

Production began on September 21 at Lake Arrowhead with Sirk back in the director's seat.

Frank Skinner composed the score for this film, the theme of which inspired a song of the same title with lyrics by Frederick Herbert. The Four Lads recorded the song with the Percy Faith orchestra. Victor Young also recorded an instrumental version of the song which featured a viola solo by Anatole Kaminsky. However, much of the score is Skinner's arrangements of works by Chopin (Nocturne No. 7 in C-sharp minor, Op. 27, No. 1 and Étude in E major, Op. 10, No. 3 "Tristesse"), Beethoven ("Ode to Joy" theme from 9th Symphony), and Johann Strauss II (Wiener Blut).

Release
The film opened at Loew's State Theatre in New York City on August 4, 1954.  Audiences were greeted by co-star Agnes Moorehead in the lobby.

Critical response
The film was generally not well received critically but did well at the box office. Howard Thompson in The New York Times of August 5, 1954 wrote "[The film] is unquestionably a handsome one. Better still, generally restrained performances at least dignify a moist text, which may seem inspiration to some, pure corn to others."

Accolades
Jane Wyman was nominated for the Academy Award for Best Actress.

References

External links 

 
 
 
 
Magnificent Obsessions an essay by Geoffrey O’Brien at the Criterion Collection

1954 films
American romantic drama films
1954 romantic drama films
Films based on American novels
Films directed by Douglas Sirk
Films produced by Ross Hunter
Universal Pictures films
Films shot in California
Remakes of American films
Films scored by Frank Skinner
Photoplay Awards film of the year winners
1950s English-language films
1950s American films
English-language romantic drama films